Ingersoll-Rand Co. v. McClendon, 498 U.S. 133 (1990), is a US labor law case, concerning the scope of labor rights in the United States.

Facts 
Mr. McClendon claimed his job was terminated to prevent his pension benefits from "vesting" (full rights becoming irrevocable if the employment contract ended) under the Employee Retirement Income Security Act of 1974. He argued this violated Texas state law public policy and sought damages for wrongful termination, mental anguish, including punitive damages. He sought to avoid a question of preemption of his claim by ERISA 1974 §514(a), by not claiming lost pension benefits, or referring to pension plan details, and instead basing a claim solely upon state law.

The Texas Courts held that he had a claim.

Judgment
Justice O’Connor held that Mr McClendon’s claim was pre-empted. The Texas public policy ‘referred to’ a pension plan, to protect its integrity against employer misconduct. The state action would also be preempted by implication as it conflicted potentially by the anti-discrimination provisions of ERISA (29 USC §1140).

O'Connor J said the following, with which the whole court concurred.

This meant, in the court's view, that a civil action under §502(a) - not including punitive damages, potentially available in state law - was the only available remedy.

In addition, Justice O'Connor offered an opinion that McClelland's claim was preempted in general. Justice Rehnquist, Justice White, Justice Scalia, Justice Kennedy, Justice Souter joined. Justice Marshall, Justice Blackmun and Justice Stevens offered no view.

See also

United States labor law

References

External links
 

1990 in United States case law
United States labor case law
United States Supreme Court cases
United States Supreme Court cases of the Rehnquist Court
Employee Retirement Income Security Act of 1974